Laura U. Marks is a philosopher and scholar of new media and film. She is the Grant Strate University Professor at Simon Fraser University (SFU). Previously, she was the Dana Wosk University Professor of Art and Cultural Studies at SFU. Among her theoretical contributions is the concept of haptic visuality, according to which a spectator's contact with media is conceived of as touching, as opposed to seeing. Marks is also a curator, and has developed exhibitions of Arab cinema.

Publications

References

External links 

 Profile at Simon Fraser University

Media studies writers
Academic staff of Simon Fraser University
Film theorists
Year of birth missing (living people)
Living people